Heteroponera majeri is a species of ant in the genus Heteroponera. Endemic to Australia, it was recently described by Taylor in 2011. Its appearance is far different to other Heteroponera species that reside in Australia.

References

Heteroponerinae
Hymenoptera of Australia
Insects of Australia
Insects described in 2011